Santee Cooper Regional Airport  is a public use airport located seven nautical miles (13 km) south of the central business district of Manning, a city in Clarendon County, South Carolina, United States. It is owned by Clarendon County and began service in 1966.  According to the FAA's National Plan of Integrated Airport Systems for 2009–2013, it is categorized as a general aviation facility.

Although many U.S. airports use the same three-letter location identifier for the FAA and IATA, this facility is assigned MNI by the FAA but has no designation from the IATA (which assigned MNI to John A. Osborne Airport in Montserrat).

Facilities and aircraft 
It has one runway designated 2/20 with an asphalt surface measuring 3,602 by 75 feet (1,098 x 23 m).

For the 12-month period ending August 20, 2009, the airport had 17,600 aircraft operations, an average of 48 per day: 99.7% general aviation and 0.3% military. At that time there were 22 aircraft based at this airport: 64% single-engine, 9% multi-engine and 27% glider.

References

External links 
 Airport data for MNI from SC Aeronautics Commission
 Aerial image as of 7 February 1994 from USGS The National Map
 

Airports in South Carolina
Buildings and structures in Clarendon County, South Carolina
Transportation in Clarendon County, South Carolina